Jan Korbička (born  4 May 1952 in Brno, Czechoslovakia) is a Czech pianist, member of Synkopy 61 rock band.

Career 
He was one of the founding member of  The Madmen band in 1967. He played on guitar and drum as a member of the group. He left the group in 1971, but at the new establishment in 1997 he rejoined to them. At the same time he is the member of Synkopy 61 band, where he plays on keyboard instruments.

References

External links 
 Official homepage of Synkopy 61

1952 births
Czech keyboardists
Musicians from Brno
Living people